Enough Is Enough is the debut studio album by Canadian rapper Big Lean.

Background
The album was released on September 4, 2015. The album was supported by two singles including "Benjamins", featuring Juelz Santana, which was released on March 6, 2015, and "California Water" featuring Nipsey Hussle. A music video for the single was released a year later on June 8, 2016.

Track listing

Critical reception

Exclaim! gave the album a 7/10, describing the album as "the underdog rapper's humble beginnings that define him and will soon push him into the spotlight".

References

2015 debut albums
Big Lean albums